Nina Grewal (born 20 October 1958), is a Canadian politician of the Conservative Party. She represented the constituency of Fleetwood—Port Kells, British Columbia from her election in the 2004 federal election to her defeat in the 2015 federal election by Liberal candidate Ken Hardie.

Biography

Grewal was born in Osaka, Japan in 1958. She and her husband lived in Liberia before emigrating to Canada, where she raised her young family while working as a sales manager selling Registered Education Savings Plans. Grewal became an active member of the community and the Reform Party of Canada (subsequently the Canadian Alliance and Conservative Party of Canada), participating in many national and regional conferences and conventions. She is married to former Member of Parliament Gurmant Grewal, and the Grewals were the first married couple in Canadian history to concurrently serve as federal MPs.

Grewal is a member of the House of Commons Standing Committee on Foreign Affairs and the Sub-Committee on International Human Rights, and she has served on the Immigration, Canadian Heritage, and Status of Women committees.

During her first term, she introduced a private members motion seeking to raise the age of consent. While the then-Liberal government defeated the measure, the subsequent Conservative government put it into law. She also proposed measures to tackle identity theft (with Bill C-271) and to amend the State Immunity Act (Bill C-346), both of which were incorporated into government legislation and subsequently passed. In addition, she pursued bills against child pornography (Bill C-347) and regulations for the volume of television commercials (Bill C-621). The Canadian Radio-television and Telecommunications Commission later decided to implement her proposals entirely.

From 15–18 May 2005, Grewal's husband surreptitiously taped his discussions with the Liberal Party which, he claimed, showed Liberal government officials enticing him to crossing the floor in exchange for patronage positions. The Liberals were concerned with saving the government during the vote of confidence, and had also contacted MPs Chuck Cadman, Inky Mark, and Belinda Stronach (the last of whom did cross the floor, and was made a minister). When the audio tapes were released, Nina Grewal publicly refused to comment about these discussions; the Liberals were cleared of any wrongdoing, and the Grewals had to explain in detail to the Parliamentary Ethics Commissioner about the discussions and secret tapings on 16 May.

On 29 November 2006, it was announced that Nina Grewal would be standing for re-election, even though her husband was not. She successfully defended her seat in the 2006, 2008, and 2011 federal elections, but lost in the 2015 election.

Grewal announced her support for Motion 312, a motion that would have Canada reexamine their definition of when human life begins.

Electoral record

 * Alan Saldanha withdrew after a controversial quote on Facebook.

References

External links

1958 births
Canadian Sikhs
People from Osaka
Conservative Party of Canada MPs
Living people
Members of the House of Commons of Canada from British Columbia
Canadian politicians of Indian descent
Canadian politicians of Punjabi descent
People from Surrey, British Columbia
Women members of the House of Commons of Canada
Women in British Columbia politics
21st-century Canadian politicians
21st-century Canadian women politicians